Izler Solomon (January 11, 1910 – December 6, 1987) was an American orchestra conductor, active mostly in the Midwest.

Career
Born in Saint Paul, Minnesota, Izler Solomon's first position as music director was
from 1936 to 1941 with the Illinois Symphony Orchestra. While there, he premiered more than 150 American works. Subsequently, he was music director of the Columbus Philharmonic Orchestra (1941–1949), and of the Indianapolis Symphony Orchestra (1956–1976). As a guest conductor Solomon appeared with the Philadelphia Orchestra, Chicago Symphony, Israel Philharmonic, and Indiana University Philharmonic Orchestra. His career was cut short by a stroke in 1976. He died in 1987 in Fort Wayne, Indiana.

He made a number of respected recordings, including the world premiere recording of Max Bruch's Violin Concerto No. 2, with the RCA Victor Symphony Orchestra, and Jascha Heifetz as soloist, in 1954.

References
 David Ewen, "Izler Solomon", in Dictators of the Baton (1943).
 Will Crutchfield, "Izler Solomon, 77, an Orchestra Conductor", New York Times, 22 December 1987. (an obituary)

External links
 A short biography  

American male conductors (music)
1910 births
1987 deaths
20th-century American conductors (music)
20th-century American male musicians